Reiterschwert is the German term for "cavalry sword" (not to be confused with Ritterschwert "knightly sword").
Specifically, it may refer to: 
The Roman spatha (as the sword of the Roman cavalry)
The late 16th century sword of the Reiter